Mustang Sally is a 2006 horror film starring Elizabeth Daily, Mark Anthony Parrish, Lindsey Labrum, Don Wallace, Erik Fellows and Al Santos. Six friends think that they are going to a house of prostitution, but encounter danger instead.

The title is a reference to the rhythm and blues tune "Mustang Sally", popularized by Wilson Pickett and later featured in several movies. It also has jazz score by trumpeter Terence Blanchard.

The German version (it is customary in Germany to have movies dubbed by German voices) features many well-known actors resp. their voices e. g. Torsten Muenchow (German voice for Antonio Banderas, Brendan Fraser, Alec Baldwin, Gérard Depardieu and others), Michael Habeck (German voice for Danny DeVito, Ernie from Sesame Street and others), Tim Schwarzmaier (German voice for Harry Potter).

The movie was released in Germany "direct to DVD" approximately beginning of February 2007.

Premise
Be careful what you wish for. Six college guys think they are going to a bordello and instead end up in a horror house. Full of sick and twisted harlots with an appetite for blood and carnage.

Cast
 Elizabeth Daily as Sally 'Mustang Sally'
 Lindsey Labrum as Caressa
 Tina McDowelle as 'Persuasion'
 Deidre A. Cannon as 'Likilick'
 Dana Fares as 'Kitten'
 Kim Holman as Janice
 Julian Jackson as 'Midnite'
 Joni Kempner as Titianna
 Alycen Malone as Tushalean
 Mark Parrish as Josh Henderson
 Erik Fellows as Mike
 Garrison Koch as Luke
 Sonny Marler as Toby
 Al Santos as Ryan
 Sean McGene as Seamus
 Cristian Burea as Lukas
 Phillip Troy Linger as Sheriff Lloyd Stevens
 Lisa K. Crosato as Mrs. Parsons
 Don Wallace as Mr. Roth
 Pam Braswell as Aunt Rita
 Teebone Mitchell as Jesse
 Iren Koster as 'Popsie'
 Jeff Pickel as Frank
 Barry Primus as Dr. Koshansky

External links

2006 films
2006 horror films
American horror films
2000s English-language films
2000s American films